Frederick Gerard Friedlander, FRS (25 December 1917 – 20 May 2001) was a German British mathematician.

He gained a first-class degree in Mechanical Sciences from Trinity College, Cambridge.
He was a Fellow of Trinity, and lecturer at Manchester University.
He was a Honorary Research Fellow at University College London.

Works
I. Diffraction by a semi-infinite plane’ 
 ‘II. Diffraction by an infinite wedge'

References

1917 births
2001 deaths
British mathematicians
Alumni of Trinity College, Cambridge
Fellows of the Royal Society